Who Is Number One? is a 1917 American silent mystery film serial directed by William Bertram and written by Anna Katharine Green. The film stars Kathleen Clifford, Cullen Landis, Gordon Sackville, Neil Hardin, Bruce Smith, and Ethel Ritchie. The film serial was released on October 29, 1917, by Paramount Pictures. It is presumed to be a lost film.

Plot

Cast 
Kathleen Clifford as Aimee Villon
Cullen Landis as Tommy Hale
Gordon Sackville		
Neil Hardin
Bruce Smith		
Ethel Ritchie	
Corinne Grant

Chapters

 The Flaming Cross
 The Flying Fortress
 The Sea Crawler
 A Marine Miracle
 Halls of Hazard
 The Flight of the Fury
 Hearts in Torment
 Walls of Gas
 Struck Down
 Wires of Wrath
 The Rail Raiders
 The Show Down
 Cornered
 No Surrender
 The Round Up

Reception
Like many American films of the time, Who Is Number One? was subject to cuts by city and state film censorship boards. The Chicago Board of Censors required cuts, in Chapter 1, of two scenes of destroying window bars, two scenes of burning vault combination, opening strong box and taking papers, first scene of attack on Hale and son, and the attack on girl in the vault; Chapter 2, five holdup scenes and the second scene of slugging young Hale; Chapter 3, three scenes of slugging watchman and the holding up of the ship's officer; Chapter 5, the intertitle "Only a door protecting her from the violence of desire", three fight scenes between girl and man, choking Hale in cab, binding and beating officers, and knocking Hale on the head; Chapter 8, the intertitle "Rayne explains why Hale still lives tho doomed to die by the T.T.T.", the bogus fireman striking officer at door of bank, and two scenes of theft of gold from bank; in Chapter 9, two scenes of threatening man with gun and four fight scenes including striking man on head; in Chapter 11, the holdup of Hale, theft of papers, a slugging scene, and the choking of the conductor and throwing him from the train; in Chapter 13, the intertitle "If you're not here in 30 minutes, both will die" and the closeup of the handcuffing by T.T.T.; in Chapter 14, the intertitle "Graham Hale must die", placing old man in trunk, the intertitle "The newspapers tomorrow will tell of the suicide of Dr. Kent", all details showing the attempt to murder Kent and give it the appearance of suicide, view of old man on pedestal after shooting through door, last struggle scene where policeman is punched, and the entire incident of throwing policeman the roof and stepping on his fingers while hanging; and, in Chapter 15, Reel 1, striking man in the head with gun and, in Reel 2, throwing man out of window.

References

External links 

 

1917 films
Film serials
1910s English-language films
American mystery films
Paramount Pictures films
Films directed by William Bertram
American black-and-white films
American silent serial films
Lost American films
1917 mystery films
1917 lost films
Lost mystery films
Silent mystery films
1910s American films